Lefktro is a village and a former municipality in Messenia, Peloponnese, Greece. Since the 2011 local government reform it is part of the municipality West Mani, of which it is a municipal unit. The municipal unit has an area of 222.981 km2. Its population is 4,699 (2011). The seat of the municipality was in Kardamyli. The village Lefktro is located above the larger village of Stoupa. Also known as Choriadaki (little town), it contains some restored Mani towers and a few newer houses, virtually all built in the traditional style, of local stone. A ten-minute walk to the sea and Stoupa's beach, it is on the slopes leading up to the Taygetos mountains.

Local communities

References

Populated places in Messenia